Kon Ka Kinh National Park is a national park of Vietnam, established by the decision (167/2002/QĐ-TTg) on November 25, 2002 of the then Prime Minister, Phan Văn Khải.

Kon Ka Kinh National Park is a priority zone for the protection of biodiversity in Vietnam and the ASEAN. It is also a biological tourist site.

Besides the biological diversity of the flora and fauna here, Kon Ka Kinh plays an important role in the protection of the upstream of the Ba River and the Dak Pne River, which supply water for tens of square kilometres of crops areas of Gia Lai Province and Kon Tum Province. To the west of this national park is the Yaly Hydroelectricity Plant.

General information
Kon Ka Kinh National Park is located on the Kon Tum Plateau, in the areas of districts Mang Yang, K'Bang, and Đắk Đoa of Gia Lai Province. The center of the park is situated in the Commune of Ayun, Mang Yang District, northeast of Gia Lai Province, 50 km northeast of Pleiku, on an area of 417.8 km² with the geological coordinates: N14°09′ to 14°30′ and E108°16′ to 108°28′. To the north of the park is the Commune of Đắk Roong of K'Bang District; to the south of the park are the Commune Hà Ra and part of Commune of A Yun and Commune Đắk Yă of Mang Yang District; to the east lie the communes of Đắk Roong, Kon Pne, Kroong, and Lơ Ku of K'Bang District; and to the west lies commune Hà Đông of Đắk Đoa District.

Kon Ka Kinh was listed as a special forest in 1986 by the Decision 194/CT dated August 9, 1986 of the Chairman of the Council of the Ministers of Vietnam, with an area of 280 km², with the purpose of preserving subtropical forest in the high mountains with species of gymnosperm. In 1999, the Forest Investigation and Planning Institute of Vietnam (FIPI), in conjunction with BirdLife International, created the Kon Ka Kinh Bird Sanctuary Project, which then was approved by the Ministry of Agriculture and Rural Development and the Gia Lai People's Committee in the same year with an area of 417.8 km². Kon Ka Kinh National Park was one of four national parks in Vietnam, together with three other national parks in Vietnam: Ba Bể, Chư Mom Ray and Hoàng Liên), also one of 27 national parks in ASEAN was listed on ASEAN Heritage Park.

Topography
The altitude of this park varies from 570 m (in valley of Ba River to 1,748 m (Kon Ka Kinh peak). Streams from the eastern part of the park are a water source for the Ba River, a twisted river running north–south until it meets the confluence A Yun River and then changes its direction to northwest–southeast before emptying into the South China Sea in Tuy Hòa city; while to the west of the river lie distributaries of the Mekong river. Owing to the sloping topography, rivers in this park are short, run fast, and create many waterfalls.

Kon Ka Kinh National Park contains 33,565 ha of natural forest, accounting for 80% of the total national park area. It is home to a variety of montane habitat types.  There are about 20 square kilometres of broad leaf and needle leaf trees, primarily Pomu (Fokienia hodginsii).

Biological diversity

Flora
Due to the characteristics of its topography, climate, soil conditions, and other factors, this park contains a great deal of biodiversity. It is home to:
 Flora typical to North Vietnam: Fabaceae, Euphorbiaceae, Magnoliaceae, Moraceae, Annonaceae, Lauraceae, Fagaceae ...etc. These families contrentrate in areas influenced by wet tropical rain. In these area, tree density is high and dominant species are not typical.
 Species native to Yunnan – Guizhou and foot of Himalaya includes: needle leaf of gymnosperm such as (Podocarpus imbricatus),  (Dacrydium pierrei), (Nageia wallichiana), (Fokienia hodginsii) ...etc.
 Species native to Malaysia-Indonesia: Dipterocarpaceae such as (Anogeissus acuminata), (Parashorea stellata), (Parashorea chinensis)...etc.

According to the survey results, Kon Ka Kinh National Park contained 687 flora species of 459 genus and 140 families, of which the class of Magnoliopsida is dominant (104 families, 337 genus, 528 species). Second domination is Liliopsida (15 families, 82 genus, 111 species). Other division of Pteridophyta includes 16 families, 32 genus and 40 species. Gymnosperm includes 5 families, 8 genus, 8 species. Kon Ka Kinh is home to several endangered and preserved endemic species, such as:
11 endemic species:  (Pinus dalatensis), hoa khế,  (Afzelia xylocarpa),  (Dalbergia annamensis),  (Dialium cochinchinense), (Alchornea annamica), du moóc,  (Calamus poilanei), lọng hiệp, (Dendrobium bellatulum).
Flora in this park includes 24 precious and rare species, valuable for genetic preservation and scientific research and were listed in Vietnam Endangered Red Book and world's Endangered Species Red Book. Of these 34 species, 24 species are listed in Vietnam Red Book, inclusive of 2 E class species (in danger of extinction), 6 V class species (will be in danger of extinction), 7 R class species (rare), 1 T class species, and 8 K class species.

Most of the area in Kon Ka Kinh National Park is covered by protozoa with the typical flora:
 Evergreen forest, subtropical wet rain and low mountain forest.
 Mixing subtropical needle and broadleaf forest, with dominant (Fokienia hodginsii) forest.

Fauna
According to the survey, Kon Ka Kinh National Park is home to 428 animal species, of which, 223 species are of vertebrates living on land (34 ordo, 74 families) and 205 species Invertebrates (such as butterfly) of 10 families of (Lepidoptera).

Mammal species including Indochinese tiger and Yellow-cheeked gibbon.

References

External links
Ka Kinh 
Kon Ka Kinh in the report of birdlifeindochina.org 
Kon Ka Kinh in the official website of Gia Lai Government Website 

National parks of Vietnam
ASEAN heritage parks
Geography of Gia Lai province
Geography of Kon Tum province
Protected areas established in 2002
2002 establishments in Vietnam